The M656 is a 5-ton 8x8 U.S. military heavy cargo truck. It was a 5-ton truck in April 1966 and was used with the Pershing 1a missile.

Development 
The M656 vehicles evolved from the XM543E2 program. The testing program ended in 1964.

Variants 
 XM656- Prototype M656
 XM757- Prototype M757
 XM791- Prototype M791
 M656- Cargo version used to carry the Pershing 1a missile Programmer Test Station and Power Station
 M757- Tractor used to tow M790 Pershing 1a missile erector launcher
 M791- Van version used for the Pershing 1a Battery Control Central

References

External links 

 M656 variants and Technical Manuals 

Military trucks of the United States
Ford trucks
Vehicles introduced in 1968
Military vehicles introduced in the 1960s